Andrew "Andy" Copelan (born in Pittsford, New York) is the head coach of the Waterdogs Lacrosse Club. Previously, Copelan was the head coach of Fairfield University from 2008 to 2019. Prior to that, Copelan was an assistant coach and offensive coordinator at the Maryland Terrapins from 2006 to 2008.  He was the head coach at Marist College from 2004 to 2005, where he led the Red Foxes to their first NCAA tournament appearance in 2005.

Copelan is a 2003 graduate of Bucknell University.  Copelan was a four-year starter at midfielder, where he helped lead the Bison to four consecutive Patriot League titles, and the program's first-ever NCAA berth in 2001. As a senior, he earned All-Patriot League accolades, and was a four-time selection to the Patriot League Academic Honor Roll for Student Athletes. He was also chosen as an alternate for the annual North-South game, a national senior all-star game.

Head coaching record

References

External links
 Fairfield profile

Year of birth missing (living people)
Living people
Fairfield Stags men's lacrosse coaches
Maryland Terrapins men's lacrosse coaches
Bucknell University alumni
People from Pittsford, New York